The 2020–21 Southern Utah Thunderbirds men's basketball team represented Southern Utah University in the 2020–21 NCAA Division I men's basketball season. The Thunderbirds, led by 5th-year head coach Todd Simon, played their home games at the America First Event Center in Cedar City, Utah as members of the Big Sky Conference. They finished the season 20-4, 12-2 in Big Sky Play to finish as regular season champions. They defeated Northern Colorado in the quarterfinals of the Big Sky tournament before losing in the semifinals to Montana State.

Previous season
The Thunderbirds finished the 2019–20 season 17–15, 9–11 in Big Sky play to finish in seventh place. They received the #7 seed in the Big Sky tournament, were they defeated the #10 seed Idaho in the first round 75–69. They were scheduled to face off against the #2 seed Northern Colorado in the quarterfinals, but the remainder of the tournament was cancelled due to the ongoing COVID-19 pandemic.

Roster

Schedule and results

|-
!colspan=12 style=| Regular season

|-
!colspan=12 style=| Big Sky tournament
|-

|-

Source

References

Southern Utah Thunderbirds men's basketball seasons
Southern Utah Thunderbirds
Southern Utah Thunderbirds men's basketball
Southern Utah Thunderbirds men's basketball